Between 1851 and 1852, the United States Army forced California's tribes to sign 18 treaties that relinquished each tribe's rights to their traditional lands in exchange for reservations. Due to pressure from California representatives, the Senate repudiated the treaties and ordered them to remain secret.  In 1896 the Bureau of American Ethnology report on major native American Indian interactions with the United States Government was the first time the treaties were made public.   The report, Indian Land Cessions in the United States (book), compiled By Charles C. Royce, includes the 18 lost treaties between the state's tribes and a map of the reservations. Below is the California segment of the report listing the treaties. The full report covered all 48 states' tribal interactions nationwide with the U.S. government.

California Indian Reservations and Cessions 

The following database is an extraction of all the United States' formal actions between 1851–1892 with California Indians documented by the Bureau of American Ethnology in its Eighteenth annual report to the Smithsonian Institution in 1896.

History 

Upon becoming a state in 1850, California was required by law to allow the United States government to conduct all formal relationships with tribal communities. Because California's previous Mexican government had no formal relationships with the Indians following the 1833 Secularization Act that closed the Spanish era's Catholic Missions, most of the 150,000 surviving tribal people either became servants for the Ranchos of California owners or migrated east to the Sierra Mountains or to the north where they mixed with other non-Mission tribes that had been left alone by Mexico.

California's farmers and gold miners demanded that Indians and other "aliens" be heavily taxed or removed from the gold fields. In 1851, at the same time that the United States was setting up the Public Land Commission as required by the 1848 Treaty of Guadalupe Hidalgo with the Republic of Mexico to verify the legality of the Ranchos of California Land Grants given California citizens prior to 1846, the government also set up a commission with military support that resulted in 134 of the state's 300-plus Indian tribes signing 18 treaties that gave away their sovereign rights in exchange for 7.4 million acres of "reservation" lands spread across the state.

Between 1851 and 1865, California carried out the wishes of its citizens: the removal of tribal communities from their ancestral lands by military force across California. The United States went along with these actions, rather than using its resources to stop the state from this period of California Genocide that was legitimized by the 1850 Indian Protection Act and numerous bond and financing actions that went to finance dozens of state militias that hunted down and killed tribal members.

During the first years between 1851 and 1852, John Frémont, a U.S. Senator for the state of California, organized the
Mariposa Battalion to round up tribal representatives who were living on his Mariposa Rancho. Frémont pushed for federal troops and three Indian Commissioners who obtained treaty agreements from tribal representatives to abandon their lands in exchange for what would be the first round of reservations for land actions in California. The state, however, refused to even allow these massive land takeaways, resulting in the treaties' initial failure, and by a Senate order their very existence was hidden from the public for over 45 years.

One of the three appointed commissioners, Oliver M. Wozencraft, reported that the government's action would lead to a "war of extermination" against the state's tribal people on May 31, 1852, even going public by publishing a pamphlet laying out the impacts, but for speaking out he was relieved of his duties by September of the same year.

The U.S. Bureau of Indian Affairs, which was originally part of the U.S. War Department, eventually set up four reservations as prescribed by Congress, followed later by additional tracts of lands ceded to various Mission Indians located mostly in Southern California. In 1896, the Smithsonian Institution produced a report documenting all historic actions by date and tribe of lands taken from or reservations created by the U.S.

Larisa Miller documented how the Northern California Indian Association (NCIA) petitioned President Roosevelt in 1903 to buy federal lands for thousands of homeless Indians across the state because "title and ownership to this beautiful land have never been extinguished." Their campaign led to the rediscovery of the 18 Treaties that were signed by 134 bands of Californians and the removal of the senate's order of secrecy on January 18, 1905.

The United States Bureau of American Ethnology produced annual reports to the Smithsonian Institution on various Native American (First Nation) subjects.  In their 18th annual, two-volume report, they published a complete list of all U.S. takings (cessions), treaties and reservations prior to 1896. The report was compiled By Charles C. Royce, with a 122-page introduction by Cyrus Thomas documenting legal claims for the actions the United States had based its actions on, with a focus on U.S. Supreme Court's 1823 Discovery doctrine decision.

It was Thomas' following statement that set the tone for the introduction:

"Its extent afforded an ample field for the ambition and enterprise of all, and the character, low culture-status, and religious beliefs of the aborigines afforded an apology for considering them a people over whom the superior genius of Europe might rightfully claim an ascendancy. The sovereigns of the Old World therefore found no difficulty in convincing themselves that they made ample compensation to the natives by bestowing on them the benefits of civilization and Christianity in exchange for control over them and their country."

The report included color maps for each state, two for California, with numbered areas (also in color) to identify each cession or reservation. These can be used to locate the land.

Indian Land Cessions in the United States 

The spreadsheet section in part 2, pages 781 – 948 is titled "Indian Land Cessions in the United States." The data are extracted from the U.S. government's treaties, reservations and land cessions with California's tribal people in the years 1851–1896. The California instances in the spreadsheet include page references to legal citation and historic materials.  All links embedded in the spreadsheet, including the names identifying particular "Mission Indian" Tribes, have been added to make the original report clearer. Some sections on individual tracts in the Public Land Survey System were omitted from the original.

Note that the below database identifies the land involved in each transaction with a number that can be located on the above maps. Later transactions are located on the 2nd map or "Ca-2", plus the appropriate number. The first 18 entries, described below as unratified treaties, were not listed as such in the 1896 Smithsonian report, but as stated lands ceded in exchange for tracts of land.

Notes

See also 

 Mission Indians
 Indian Reductions
 California mission clash of cultures
 Population of Native California
 Aboriginal title in California
 Native Americans in California
 Slavery among Native Americans in the United States
 Genízaros

References

External links 

 O.M. Wozencraft [1851], "To the People Living and Trading Among the Indians in the State of California".
 Indian Nations Tribal Sovereignty by Roy Moore
 Historic Marker and Adobe where Treaty K at Temecula Ca. on January 5th, 1852
 Digital copy of January 5th 1852 Treaty K
 1920 Congressional subcommittee on Indian Affairs – 18 treaties and their congressional history
 National Park Service link to state by state tribal naming variations.
 List of Federally Recognized Tribes in California
  The Journal of George W. Barbour, May 1, to October 4, 1851: Part I
 The Journal of George W. Barbour, May 1, to October 4, 1851: Part 2

 
reserv
Native American law
reserv
Former American Indian reservations
United States and Native American treaties